Teolândia is a municipality in the state of Bahia in the North-East region of Brazil.

The municipality contains part of the  Caminhos Ecológicos da Boa Esperança Environmental Protection Area, created in 2003.

See also
List of municipalities in Bahia

References

Municipalities in Bahia